This is a list showing the most populous cities in the province of Khyber Pakhtunkhwa (KPK), Pakistan as of the 2017 Census of Pakistan. In the following table, you can find each of the 46 cities and towns in the province with populations higher than 30,000 as of March 15, 2017. City populations found in this list only refer to populations found within the city's defined limits and any adjacent cantonments. The census totals below come from the Pakistan Bureau of Statistics.

Map

List

Notes 
A.  This city did not exist as a municipality and was not classified as an urban area at the time of the 1998 Pakistan Census.

See also 
 List of cities in Pakistan by population
 List of cities in Balochistan, Pakistan by population
 List of cities in Sindh by population
 List of cities in Punjab, Pakistan by population
 List of populated places in Khyber Pakhtunkhwa

References 

Khyber Pakhtunkhwa
Khyber Pakhtunkhwa

Cities